Amin ul-Hasanat (1 February 1922 – 5 January 1960), better known as the Pir of Manki Sharif, was the son of Pir Abdul Rauf and an Islamic religious leader in the North-West Frontier Province (NWFP) of British India (now Pakistan). After joining the All-India Muslim League in 1945, he was noted for his campaign in the provincial referendum held in early part of 1947, that saw the NWFP become part of Pakistan rather than India. He was popularly known as ''Fateh-e-Referendum''.

Muslim League 
Amin ul-Hasanat was highly influenced and inspired by the Pakistan Resolution of March 1940 passed by the All-India Muslim League at Lahore. Soon after joining the All-India Muslim League in 1945, Hasanat toured the NWFP to win support for the Muslim League. On October 1, 1945, Hasanat organized a historic meeting of the Ulema and Mashaikh at Peshawar, which passed resolutions expressing full loyalty with the Muslim League and also expressed complete confidence in Jinnah's leadership. Then he invited the Muslim League leader Mohammad Ali Jinnah to tour the Province which Jinnah did on 24 November 1945. Jinnah's visit boosted the morale of Pir Sahib and his devoted followers. His vigorous campaign for Pakistan Movement in the NWFP area bore fruit and contributed significantly to the Muslim League's success in the referendum, held in early part of 1947 in the then NWFP. In one of Jinnah's letters to Hasanat, he promised that sharia law would be applied to the affairs of the Muslim community.

This success of the Muslim League in the referendum held in NWFP became the basis for the British government to decide in favor of accession of the NWFP to Pakistan.

Opposition 
After the independence of Pakistan in 1947, however, Pir Sahib was very disappointed by some of the decisions made by the party. He cut-off his relations with the Muslim League due to his ideological differences with Khan Abdul Qayyum Khan, who emerged as the first Muslim League premier in NWFP. He decided to launch his own Awami Muslim League party that started to play the role of opposition in the NWFP Provincial Assembly. His view was that Opposition was the spirit of democratic set up and that it was critical to attain the previously stated objectives of the Muslim League. After he saw new local leadership emerge in the province, he felt that those ideals were being overlooked by the changed Muslim League leadership. Disillusioned, he retired from active politics in 1955 to devote more time to his religious activities.

Commemorative postage stamp
Pakistan Post Office issued a commemorative postage stamp to honor him in its 'Pioneers of Freedom' series in 1990.

Death 
He died on 28 January 1960, at the young age of 37, a few weeks after a car accident on 5 January 1960 near Fateh Jang, Attock District in Punjab, Pakistan. He was buried at his hometown Manki Sharif, Nowshera District, NWFP, Pakistan.

See also 
 Abdur Rab Nishtar
 Muhammad Karam Shah al-Azhari

References

Further reading 
 
 

Pakistan Movement activists from the North-West Frontier Province
Pashtun people
People from Nowshera District
1922 births
1960 deaths
All India Muslim League members
Barelvis